"Bar at the End of the World" is a song written by J. T. Harding, Aimee Mayo, and David Lee Murphy and recorded by American country music artist Kenny Chesney, released on 2 January 2017 as the third single from Chesney's album Cosmic Hallelujah (2016).

Content
The song is a mid-tempo recalling a bar. Co-writer J. T. Harding told Nash Country Daily that the song was inspired by "these bars there that you can only get to by boat" that he saw while visiting a friend in the Virgin Islands. He said that he did not have a title for the song until he saw a sign reading "Tavern at the End of the World" in Boston. Harding presented the idea to David Lee Murphy at a songwriting session, and Murphy provided the opening lines.

Charts

Weekly charts

Year-end charts

References

2016 songs
2017 singles
Kenny Chesney songs
Columbia Nashville Records singles
Songs written by Aimee Mayo
Songs written by David Lee Murphy
Song recordings produced by Buddy Cannon
Songs written by J. T. Harding
Columbia Records singles